Dimitar Ralchev (Bulgarian: Димитър Ралчев) (born 27 April 1971) is a Bulgarian former footballer. In his career, he represented Spartak Varna, Beroe and was also part of the Olympik Teteven team during their only season in the A PFG.

References

1971 births
Living people
Bulgarian footballers
PFC Beroe Stara Zagora players
PFC Spartak Varna players
First Professional Football League (Bulgaria) players
Association footballers not categorized by position